Max Roach + 4 is an LP recorded by jazz drummer Max Roach, which featured Kenny Dorham on trumpet, Sonny Rollins on tenor sax, Ray Bryant on piano, and George Morrow on bass.  It was the first album Roach recorded after his collaborators, trumpeter Clifford Brown and pianist Richie Powell, died in a car crash in June 1956.

Reception

Allmusic awarded the album 4½ stars calling it a "worthy set".

Track listing
All compositions by Max Roach except as indicated
 "Ezz-Thetic" (George Russell) – 9:18
 "Dr. Free-Zee" – 2:06
 "Just One of Those Things" (Cole Porter) – 7:18
 "Mr X." – 5:15
 "Body and Soul" (Edward Heyman, Robert Sour, Frank Eyton, Johnny Green) – 6:50
 "Woody 'n' You" (Dizzy Gillespie) – 6:51
 "It Don't Mean a Thing (If It Ain't Got That Swing)" (Duke Ellington, Irving Mills) - 4:45 Bonus track on CD reissue
 "Love Letters" (Edward Heyman, Victor Young) - 8:57 Bonus track on CD reissue
 "Minor Trouble" (Ray Bryant) - 6:58 Bonus track on CD reissue
Recorded in New York City on September 17 (tracks 3–5) and September 19 (tracks 1, 2 & 6), 1956 and at Capitol Tower Studios in Hollywood, California on  March 18 (tracks 7 & 8) and March 20 (track 9), 1957

Personnel 
Max Roach - drums
Kenny Dorham - trumpet
Sonny Rollins - tenor saxophone
Ray Bryant (tracks 1–6), Bill Wallace (tracks 7–9) - piano
George Morrow - bass

References 

1956 albums
Max Roach albums
EmArcy Records albums
Albums produced by Bob Shad